Titanoboa is an extinct genus of very large snakes that lived in what is now La Guajira in northeastern Colombia. This snake lived during the Middle to Late Paleocene epoch, around 60 to 58 million years ago, following the extinction of all non-avian dinosaurs. Although originally thought to be an apex predator, the discovery of skull bones revealed that it was more than likely specialized in preying on fish. The only known species is Titanoboa cerrejonensis, the largest snake ever discovered, which supplanted the previous record holder, Gigantophis garstini.

History and naming 

In 2009, the fossils of 30 individuals of T. cerrejonensis were found in the Cerrejón Formation of the coal mines of Cerrejón in La Guajira, Colombia. These specimens consist of the holotype, a large precloacal vertebrae, the paratype, also a vertebrae, and 184 additional remains identified as additional vertebrae and ribs (some of which found in articulation), amounting to a total of 28 specimens in addition to the holotype and paratype. Before this discovery, few fossils of Paleocene-epoch vertebrates had been found in ancient tropical environments of South America. The snake was discovered on an expedition by a team of international scientists led by Jonathan Bloch, a University of Florida vertebrate paleontologist, and Carlos Jaramillo, a paleobotanist from the Smithsonian Tropical Research Institute in Panama. Field work continued following these initial discoveries, recovering multiple additional specimens including three skulls with associated postcranial bones.

The scientific name combines the Greek word "Titan" with Boa, the type genus of the family Boidae. The species name on the other hand is a reference to the Cerrejón region.

Description  

Most material of Titanoboa consists of vertebrae that in life would be located before the cloaca. They are robust with a uniquely T-shaped neural spine. The skull is only briefly described in a 2013 abstract. According to it, Titanoboa is unique in the high amount of palatal and marginal tooth positions compared to others boids, the quadrate bone is oriented at a low angle and the articulation of both the palatine to pterygoid and pterygoid to quadrate are heavily reduced. The teeth themselves are weakly ankylosed, meaning they are not strongly connected to the jawbone.

Based on the size of the vertebrae, Titanoboa is the largest snake in the paleontological record. In modern constrictors like boids and pythonids, increased body size is achieved through larger vertebrae rather than an increase in the number of bones making up the skeleton, allowing for length estimates based on individual bones. Based on comparison between the undistorted Titanoboa vertebrae and the skeleton of modern boas, Head and colleagues found that the analysed specimens fit a position towards the later half of the precloacal vertebral column, approximately 60 to 65% back from the first two neck vertebrae. The later discovery of skull material allowed for size estimates based on skull to body length proportions. These estimates far exceeds the largest modern snakes, the green anaconda and the reticulated python and the previous record holder, the madtsoid Gigantophis. The existence of eight additional specimens of similar size to the one used in these calculations implies that Titanoboa reached such massive proportions regularly.

Classification
Vertebrae morphology places the snake in the family Boinae alongside other large constrictors of the Americas such as anacondas and typical boas. The skull material confirmed Titanoboas initial placement within the family, now also supported by the reduced palatine choanal. Specifically, the 2013 abstract recovered the giant snake being closely connected to taxa from the Pacific Islands and Madagascar, linking Old World and New World boids and suggesting that the two lineages must have diverged by the Paleocene at the latest. This would place Titanoboa at the stem of Boinae, a result later corroborated by a study in 2015.

Palaeobiology

Habitat
Due to the warm and humid greenhouse climate of the Paleocene, the region of what is now Cerrejón was covered by wet tropical rainforests that covered coastal plains that housed large river systems, which were inhabited by various freshwater animals, especially reptiles. Among the native reptiles are three different types of dyrosaurs, crocodylomorphs that survived the KPG extinction event independently from modern crocodilians. The genera that coexisted alongside Titanoboa included the large, slender-snouted Acherontisuchus, the medium sized but broad-headed Anthracosuchus and the relatively small Cerrejonisuchus, which may have been relatively more terrestrial than its relatives. Turtles also thrived in the tropical wetlands of Paleocene Colombia, giving rise to several species of considerable size such as Cerrejonemys and Carbonemys, two genera of Podocnemididae, and Puentemys, a bothremydid.

The rainforests of the Cerrejón Formation mirror modern tropical forests in regards to the families that make up much of the vegetation, however unlike today, these Paleocene forests were relatively low in diversity. Although it is possible that this low diversity is the result of the wetland nature of the depositional environment, samples from other localities corresponding with this time frame suggest that the forests that arose shortly following the Cretaceous Paleogene mass extinction were of similar composition. This would indicate that the low plant diversity of the time may be a direct result of the mass extinction preceding it. Plants found in these Paleocene forests include Zingiberales, Salvinia and Araceae among others.

Diet
Initially, Titanoboa was thought to have acted much like a modern anaconda based on its size and the environment it was deposited in, with researchers suggesting that it may have in part fed on the local crocodylomorph fauna. However, in a 2013 abstract Jason Head and colleagues note that the skull of this snake displays multiple adaptations to a piscivorous diet such as the anatomy of the palate, tooth count and the anatomy of the teeth themselves. These adaptations bear resemblance to modern caenophidian snakes with a piscivorous diet and is unique among boids. Such a lifestyle would be supported by the extensive rivers of Paleocene Colombia, as well as the fossil fish (lungfish and osteoglossomorphs) recovered from the formation.

Climate implications
In the 2009 type description Head and colleagues correlate the gigantism observed in Titanoboa with the climate conditions of its environment. As a poikilothermic ectotherm, Titanoboas internal temperature and metabolism were heavily dependent on the ambient temperature, which would in turn affect the animal's size. Accordingly, large ectothermic animals are typically found in the tropics and decrease in size the further one moves away from the equator. Following this correlation, the authors suggest that the mean annual temperature can be calculated by comparing the maximum body size of poikilotherm animals found in two localities. Based on the relation between temperatures in the modern Neotropics and the maximum length of anacondas, Head and colleagues calculate a mean annual temperature of at least 32–33 °C for the equatorial region of Paleocene South America. The estimates are consistent with a hot Paleocene climate model as suggested by a study published in 2003 and slightly higher (1-5 °C) than estimates derived from the oxygen isotopes of planktonic foraminifer. Although these estimates exceed temperatures of modern tropical forests, the paper argues that the increase in temperature is balanced out by higher amounts of rainfall.

However, this conclusion was questioned by several researchers following the publication of the paper. J. M. Kale Sniderman used the same methodology as Head and colleagues on the Pleistocene monitor lizard Varanus priscus, comparing it to the extant Komodo dragon. Sniderman calculates that following this method, the modern tropics should be able to support lizards much larger than what is observed today, or in the reverse, that Varanus priscus is much larger than what would be implied by the ambient temperature of its native range. In conclusion it is argued that Paleocene rainforests may not have been any hotter than those today and that the massive size of Titanoboa and Varanus priscus may instead be the results of lacking significant mammalian competition. Mark W. Denny, Brent L. Lockwood and George N. Somero also disagree with Head's conclusion. They note that although this method first employed by Makarieva is applicable to smaller poikilotherms, it is not constant across all size ranges. As thermal equilibrium is achieved through the relation between volume and surface area, they argue that the large size of Titanoboa coupled with the high temperatures proposed by Head et al. would mean that the animal would overheat easily if resting in a coiled up state. The authors conclude that several key factors influence the relationship between Titanoboa and the temperature of the area it inhabited. Varying posture could help cool down if needed, basking behavior or heat absorption through the substrate are both unknown and the potentially semi-aquatic nature of the animal creates additional factors to consider. Ultimately, Denny and colleagues argue that the nature of the giant snake renders it a poor indicator for the climate of the Paleocene and that the mean annual temperature must have been 4 to 6° C (7 to 11 °F) cooler than the current estimate.

These issues, alongside adjustments suggested by Makarieva, were addressed by Head and his team the same year, arguing that Denny and colleagues misunderstand their proposed model. They retort that the method takes into account variation caused by body size and that it's furthermore based on the largest extant snakes, making it an appropriate method. They also add that the results recovered are consistent with large extant snakes, which are also known to perform thermoregulation through behavior. Sniderman's proposal that the correlation between body size and temperature is inconsistent with modern monitor lizards is addressed twofold. For one, Head argues, Komodo dragons are a poor analogy as they are geographically restricted to the islands of Indonesia, limiting the size they could grow to while both green anacondas and Titanoboa are mainland animals. Secondly the response notes that the size estimates utilized for Varanus priscus are overestimates and unreliable, being based on secondary reports that do not match better supported estimates indicating a  range for the monitor.

References 

†Titanoboa
†Titanoboa
Prehistoric reptile genera
Paleocene lepidosaurs
Paleocene reptiles of South America
Selandian life
Thanetian life
Peligran
Itaboraian
Paleogene Colombia
Fossils of Colombia
Cerrejón Formation
Fossil taxa described in 2009